Black Circle Boys is a 1997 American drama film written and directed by Matthew Carnahan and starring Scott Bairstow, Eric Mabius and Donnie Wahlberg.  It is Carnahan's feature directorial debut.

Cast
Scott Bairstow as Kyle
Eric Mabius as Shane
Heath Lourwood as Munn
Chad Lindberg as Rory
Tara Subkoff as Chloe
Dee Wallace as Mrs. Sullivan
Donnie Wahlberg
John Doe
Lisa Loeb

References

External links
 
 

American drama films
1997 drama films
1997 films
1990s English-language films
1990s American films